Harpagodes aranea is an extinct species of fossil sea snail, a marine gastropod mollusk in the family Harpagodidae. This species is found in deposits ranging from the Jurassic to the Cretaceous.

References
Stromboidea gastropods
Klaus Bandel, Hamburg About the larval shell of some Stromboidea, connected to a review of the classification and phylogeny of the Strombimorpha (Caenogastropoda) 

Jurassic gastropods
Cretaceous gastropods
Jurassic first appearances
Cretaceous extinctions